Globosat, was a Brazilian pay television content service, part of Grupo Globo. Established in 1991, after the creation of subscription television services in Brazil, with 29 channels and over 1,000 employees, it is the largest pay television content provider in Brazil, as well as of Latin America, comprising a domestic audience of 45 million viewers distributed among more than 15 million households.

History 

In 1993, Globosat split its content generation and distribution businesses. Cable TV sales and distribution were assigned to Net Brasil, which was also responsible for installing cable networks in selected cities. Nowadays NET is responsible for the cable network in those cities. Content production and programming remained with Globosat, renamed to Canais Globosat.

It has also operated a channel in Portugal, TV Globo Portugal, having earlier operated a similar channel, GNT Portugal, until 2006.

On September 15, 2020, Globosat merged its operations with Rede Globo, following Grupo Globo's "Uma só Globo" ("One Globo") restructuring; the merger made Globosat being renamed that day to Canais Globo.

Canais Globo's networks

Current networks

 TV Globo (free-to-air)
 Modo Viagem
 Canal Brasil2
 GNT
 Gloob
 Gloobinho
 Multishow
 Bis
 Canal OFF

Streaming
 Globoplay
 Canais Globo app (formerly known as MUU and Globosat Play, will defunct soon)
 Combate app
 Premiere app
 Sexy Hot

Adult content
 Playboy TV
 Sextreme
 Sexy Hot
 Venus

In association with Globo
 Canal Viva
 Globo News
 Globo Internacional
 Canal Futura*
*Operated by Fundação Roberto Marinho.
Films and Series
 Rede Telecine
 Telecine Action
 Telecine Cult
 Telecine Fun
 Telecine Pipoca
 Telecine Premium
 Telecine Touch
 Megapix
 NBCUniversal International Networks Brasil (joint-venture with Comcast/NBCUniversal)
 Universal TV
 Studio Universal
 Syfy

Sports
 SporTV
 SporTV 2
 SporTV 3
 SporTV 4
 SporTV 5
 SporTV+
 Combate
 Premiere  
 PFC Internacional

1 - Joint-venture with Disney, Universal Studios, Metro-Goldwyn-Mayer and Paramount Pictures.

2 - Joint-venture with a group of Brazilian filmmakers.

3 - Playboy do Brasil is a joint-venture created from the association between Globosat and Playboy TV Latin America.

Former networks

 Shoptime (currently owned by Americanas) - home shopping
 Premiere Filmes (pay-per-view) new film releases
 Canal Rural (formerly a joint-venture with Grupo RBS, later owned only by RBS, now part of J&F Investimentos) - agrochannel
 Premiere Rural (pay-per-view) rodeos and agrochannel
 Telecine HD - (premium channel) - movies in high definition
 Private (joint-venture with Playboy do Brasil) - adult content
 ForMan (joint-venture with Playboy do Brasil) - adult content
 +Bis (on demand)
 Telecine Zone (on demand)
 Receitas GNT (on demand)
 Sexy Hot 360° (on demand)
 Big Brother Brasil Play
 Bis Play
 Canal Brasil Play
 Canal OFF Play
 Globo News Play
 Gloob Play
 Gloobinho Play
 GNT Play
 Mais Globosat Play
 Megapix Play
 Multishow Play
 SporTV Play
 Studio Universal Play
 Syfy Play
 Universal TV Play
 Viva Play
 Philos TV
 Telecine app

External links
 Globosat (Portuguese)

 
Mass media companies of Brazil
Television networks in Brazil
Grupo Globo subsidiaries
Companies based in Rio de Janeiro (city)
Mass media companies established in 1991
Brazilian brands